Maverick Viñales Ruiz (born 12 January 1995) is a Spanish Grand Prix motorcycle racer. Viñales is the 2013 Moto3 World Champion, currently riding in MotoGP for the Aprilia Racing team. After five seasons as a MotoGP factory rider with the  Yamaha Factory Racing team, his contract was terminated by mutual consent midway through the 2021 season.

Career

Early career
Born in Figueres, Alt Empordà, Viñales began competitive racing at the age of three in minimotos before moving onto motocross and eventually to circuit racing in 2002, competing in the Catalan 50cc Championship, before several successful seasons in 70cc "metrakit" bikes. In 2007, he became champion of the Catalan 125cc Championship, and repeated the feat in 2008, as well as winning the Mediterranean Trophy. Also in 2008, he competed at selected events in the German IDM 125GP Championship for RZT Racing aboard an Aprilia RS 125 R, achieving a best result of seventh. He moved up to the CEV Buckler 125GP series in 2009, with the Blusens-BQR team, partnering Miguel Oliveira in the team. Viñales finished the season as Rookie of the Year as he finished as the runner-up to Alberto Moncayo in the championship standings, by just four points. Viñales claimed four successive podiums during the season, including a victory at Jerez. In 2010, Viñales and Oliveira joined different teams from Blusens and battled it out for the championship title and despite winning only two races – both at Albacete – compared to Oliveira's four wins and two second places, Viñales took the title by just two points after finishing each of the season's seven races on the podium as Oliveira crashed out of one race at Albacete. The single race for the 2010 European Championship title was also taking place at Viñales's winning circuit Albacete where he narrowly took his third victory of the year at the same venue.

125cc World Championship

Blusens-BQR Team (2011)

Viñales moved to the 125cc World Championship ahead of the  season, partnering category veteran Sergio Gadea, who returned to the 125cc class after a season in Moto2, at the SuperMartxé VIP team after the Blusens-BQR team joined forces with American socialite Paris Hilton. He impressed during pre-season testing at Valencia, and finished ninth on his Grand Prix début in Qatar. After retiring at Jerez due to brake failure, Viñales finished fourth at Estoril, narrowly missing out on a podium to Johann Zarco in a photo-finish with the margin between the pair being 0.002 seconds. Two weeks later at Le Mans, Viñales took his first front-row grid start with third place, and after a race-long battle with championship leader Nicolás Terol, Terol made a mistake at the penultimate corner and Viñales cut inside him and took the victory by 0.048 seconds. Three further victories during the season enabled Viñales to finish his rookie season in third place in the championship rankings and he won the Rookie of the Year award.

Moto3 World Championship

Blusens Avintia (2012)

Viñales went into the 2012 season as title favourite in the newly formed Moto3 championship. He won five races early on in the season, but a lack of consistency with several crashes meant that he was not able to keep up with Sandro Cortese. Going into Malaysia still with a slim chance of winning the title, he shocked fans and media when he angrily left his team and flew back home, withdrawing from the race. Cortese won the race and the title with Luis Salom moving into second place. Viñales later stated that he had not been informed of offers from other Moto3 teams, that the team refused to move him up into Moto2 and instead made him sign an extension to his contract into 2014 and that he was unable to win with them as it was a "second division team". Viñales eventually apologized and returned to the team for the final two races of the season, securing third in the standings, but losing the runner-up spot to Salom.

Team Calvo (2013)
He moved to Team Calvo for 2013, riding alongside Ana Carrasco. Sorting out his new contract after his walkout in Malaysia supposedly was a very delicate affair which included a high release fee having to be paid to his former team and interest also being expressed by the Marc VDS Moto3 team. He won his first two races with Team Calvo back-to-back at round three and four, the Spanish and French Grand Prix. In later races he had several opportunities to win as he was leading the last laps at San Marino, Aragon and Philip Island, but on all occasions he was eventually overtaken by fellow Spanish rider Álex Rins. He was starting to fade from the title fight with two races to go and only a slim chance left to win, but at Motegi both championship front runners Luis Salom and Alex Rins didn't score any points as both crashed out of the race, Salom being taken out by Viñales' cousin Isaac Viñales. Viñales finished second behind rookie Álex Márquez, putting him back into the title fight. The three riders went into the final round with a gap of just five points between them. As Salom crashed out and rejoined to finish 14th, Rins and Viñales continued battling until the last corner. In the end, Viñales narrowly took the victory and Moto3 World Championship with Rins finishing runner-up.

Moto2 World Championship

Pons Racing (2014)

2014 
Viñales signed a two-year contract with Pons Racing, due to expire at the end of 2015. He joined former title rival Luis Salom in the team. He took his first intermediate class victory at the Circuit of the Americas on 13 April 2014. He ultimately finished the season in third place in the riders' championship with four wins and nine podiums. He also won the Rookie of the Year award.

MotoGP World Championship

Team Suzuki Ecstar (2015–2016)

In September 2014 it was announced that Viñales would move up to the MotoGP class for the  season, riding for the factory Suzuki team on their return to the class. He partnered Aleix Espargaró at the team. Viñales became the first rider to move up to MotoGP after just one lone season in Moto2, even all-time greats like Valentino Rossi and Marc Márquez spent two years in the intermediate category.

2015
Viñales had a decent debut season with the factory Suzuki team. As it was the comeback year for the Japanese manufacturer, they received various concessions for development, and the bike underwent several changes during the season. Viñales finished 16 out of 18 races, scoring six Top-10 results along the way, once again showing consistency as his strength. He ended the season in 12th place, winning the Rookie of the Year award.

2016
The 2016 season saw an improved bike and almost immediate success for Viñales and the factory Suzuki team. Viñales took his first MotoGP podium with third place in France. and his first ever MotoGP win at the British Grand Prix and Suzuki's first win since Chris Vermeulen's win in France in 2007, moving him to 4th place in the championship.

Monster Energy Yamaha MotoGP (2017–2021)
After Jorge Lorenzo announced his move to the Ducati team, Viñales was signed to replace him at the factory Yamaha team in 2017 and 2018.

2017
His 2017 MotoGP campaign started with victory in Qatar making him the first rider to win on debut for Yamaha since Valentino Rossi in 2004 and the first rider to win on a debut for any team since Casey Stoner in 2011. His strong start to the season continued with victory in Argentina, leading to many tipping Viñales as a championship contender. In the following race in the USA, there was disappointment when Viñales was forced to retire, crashing after only 2 laps from fourth place. Viñales followed this up with a sixth-place finish in Jerez and a hard-fought victory over Rossi at Le Mans. However, this was to be his last victory of the season. Viñales went on to take third in the rider's championship, finishing the season on 230 points, 22 points ahead of this teammate.

2018
At the Yamaha official season launch in January 2018, Viñales announced that he had signed a two-year contract extension, guaranteeing his factory seat through the 2020 season. The 2018 season was difficult for Viñales and a struggling Yamaha team. Despite a number of early season podiums for Viñales and his teammate Rossi, Yamaha set a new record winless streak of 25 races before Viñales scored a win at Phillip Island. Viñales finished the season with 193 points in fourth place of the rider's championship, 5 points behind his teammate.

2019
In November 2018 as the provisional 2019 entry list was published, Viñales confirmed he would be switching from his traditional race number 25 to the number 12 previously used by Troy Bayliss. Viñales claimed the change was because he "felt that [he] needed to do something different" and had previously used the number 12 in motocross as a youth, since his birthday is 12 January.
Viñales win Dutch TT and Malaysia. Viñales went on to take third in the rider's championship, finishing the season on 211 points.

2020
The 2020 season was shortened by the COVID-19 pandemic. Viñales started strongly in the Spanish opening double-header, with two second-place finishes. At the fifth round in Styria, Viñales suffered a brake malfunction on the 17th lap, forcing him to leap from the bike at high speed at the end of the start-finish straight, leading to a fiery crash and a red flag of the race. He struggled in later races, scoring one win in Emilia Romagna but only managing one other top five finish in Aragon, before ending the season sixth overall in the championship standings.

2021
After struggling for consistency during the pandemic-shortened 2020 season, Viñales started 2021 with a dominating win in Qatar. Results in the following races were disappointing – while teammate Fabio Quartararo performed strongly to become a title favourite – culminating in the German Grand Prix where Viñales recorded his worst MotoGP weekend, qualifying 21st on the grid and finishing last of all classified riders. His fortunes looked to be improving at the subsequent Dutch TT, where he qualified on pole, but ultimately finished second behind teammate Quartararo to score just his second podium finish of the season. The following day on June 28, 2021, Viñales made the shock announcement that he had terminated his contract with Yamaha and would leave the factory team after the 2021 season prematurely and not see out the full term until the end of 2022.

Prior to the Austrian Grand Prix, Yamaha withdrew Viñales' entry citing telemetry data indicating "unexplained irregular operation of the motorcycle" during the Styrian Grand Prix. These irregularities led to his suspension by the team, as it was thought his actions could potentially have damaged the engine, putting himself and other riders at serious risk.

Aprilia Racing Team Gresini (2021)
In August 2021, it was announced that Viñales would join the factory Aprilia racing team from 2022, initially on a one-year contract, joining existing rider Aleix Espargaró. On 20 August 2021, Yamaha and Viñales ended their contract with immediate effect, opening the door for Viñales to make an early debut with Aprilia at the Aragon Grand Prix on 12 September. Viñales took the place of regular team rider Lorenzo Savadori, who was injured in August and will continue to act as the team's test rider. Viñales finished the season 10th in the rider's standings, with 106 points.

Aprilia Racing (2022–present)
Viñales' first podium with Aprilia came at the Dutch TT. Then, he finished second in the British Grand Prix. He finished third for his third podium in four races at the San Marino Grand Prix.

On 26 May 2022, Viñales signed a contract extension with the team for 2023 and 2024, still teaming up with Aleix Espargaró.

Career statistics

Grand Prix motorcycle racing

By season

By class

Races by year
(key) (Races in bold indicate pole position, races in italics indicate fastest lap)

Personal life
Viñales has a cousin, Isaac Viñales, who has competed in the 125cc, Moto3 and Moto2 World Championships.

He was named Maverick at birth because his father was a fan of Top Gun.

Viñales had another cousin, Dean Berta Viñales, who died aged 15 on 25 September 2021 in a Supersport 300 race at Jerez after being involved in a collision.

References

External links

 
 

1995 births
Living people
Spanish motorcycle racers
Motorcycle racers from Catalonia
People from Alt Empordà
Sportspeople from the Province of Girona
125cc World Championship riders
Moto3 World Championship riders
Moto2 World Championship riders
Suzuki MotoGP riders
Yamaha Motor Racing MotoGP riders
MotoGP World Championship riders
Gresini Racing MotoGP riders
Aprilia Racing MotoGP riders
Moto3 World Riders' Champions